Hunworth is a village and former civil parish, now in the parish of Stody, in the North Norfolk district, in the county of Norfolk, England. The nearest railway station is at Sheringham for the Bittern Line which runs between Sheringham, Cromer and Norwich. The nearest airport is Norwich International Airport. The village is situated on the road between Holt and Briston. In 1931 the parish had a population of 173.

History
The villages name means 'Huna's enclosure'.

Hunworth has an entry in the Domesday Book of 1085. In the great book Edgefield is recorded by the name of Hunaworda, Huneworda or Huneworde . The parish is Kings land with main landholders being Alstan, who had been the pre-conquest holder, and his main tenant is said to be Ribald from count Alan and Walter Gifford. There is said to be 4½ Mills. In the Domesday survey fractions were used to indicate that the entry, in this case a Mill, was situated within more than one parish. On 1 April 1935 the parish was abolished and merged with Stody.

Castle Hill
On the north east of the village there are the remains of medieval ringworks. These remains are situated on the spur of a hill and overlook the village strategically commanding two crossing points on the river Glaven. The penannular earthwork consist of an inner bank, a ditch and a slight counterscarp bank. During excavations carried out in 1965 traces of a possible timber revetment were found which may have been constructed as part of an enclosure. This site is described as a Timber castle and probably Norman. The earthworks are a scheduled monument protected by law.

Prominent buildings

The parish church of Saint Lawrence

The parish church at Hunworth has a very stark interior with tall whitewashed walls which reach up to the arch-braced roof. The only wall tablet is deducted to the men who did not return from the First World War. In the nave there stands a statue of Saint Lawrence holding his Gridiron. Lawrence is said to have been martyred on a gridiron. During his torture Lawrence cried out "This side’s done, turn me over and have a bite." ["Assum est, inquit, versa et manduca."]. The statue stands in a 12-inch niche cut on the angle of a 14th-century window on the north east side of the building. The chancel was rebuilt in the 1850s and within it there hangs a Turkish sanctuary lamp made from bronze filigree. Local folklaw says that this lamp was once the property of Florence Nightingale. To the outside of the church there is a 12th-century tower. On the south elevation there is a Saxon window which was discovered only in the 1960s giving an idea of the age of this building.

Hunworth Hall
Hunworth hall was built in 1699 For Edmund Britliffe. It is constructed over two storeys and is of rendered brickwork. To the front elevation there are six bays with a central doorcase with pilasters which are a later addition from circa the 18th century. The brick and flint barn north of the hall, which also dates from the 18th century, has Britliffe's initials set into the wall. Another barn to further north dates to about 1700 and seems to have started as a house, been converted to a stock-house, then back to a house.

Hunworth watermill
Hunworth watermill stands on the river Glaven and the building seen today dates from the 1750s. There has been a mill on the site for even longer with records showing milling dues being paid to Edward the Confessor. The building is constructed from Norfolk red brick and flint and has a pantiled roof. When the mill was sold in 1974 it had been unused for forty years and all its machinery was intact. It has since been renovated into a dwelling and is a grade II listed mill house.

The Bell public house
The Hunny Bell, as locals call it, stands on the village green and was formally called the Bluebell inn. The building dates from the 18th century.

The pub was rebranded as The Hunworth Bell and is now (as of August 2017) run by multi-award-winning Ben and Sarah Handley also of The Duck Inn, Stanhoe.

Ben and Sarah have owned The Duck Inn for several years and have won numerous accolades including becoming The Good Food Guide Restaurant of the Year 2017.

Gallery

References

http://kepn.nottingham.ac.uk/map/place/Norfolk/Hunworth

External links

Hunworth Bell www.hunworthbell.co.uk

Villages in Norfolk
Former civil parishes in Norfolk
North Norfolk